The 2018 Vuelta a España is the 73rd edition of the Vuelta a España, one of cycling's Grand Tours. The Vuelta began in Málaga, with an individual time trial on 25 August, and Stage 12 occurred on 6 September with a stage from Mondoñedo. The race finishes in Madrid on 16 September.

Classification standings

Stage 12
6 September 2018 — Mondoñedo to Punta de Estaca de Bares,

Stage 13
7 September 2018 — Candás to La Camperona,

Stage 14
8 September 2018 — Cistierna to Les Praeres de Nava,

Stage 15
9 September 2018 — Ribera de Arriba to Lagos de Covadonga,

Rest day 2
10 September 2018 — Santander

Stage 16
11 September 2018 — Santillana del Mar to Torrelavega,  (ITT)

Rohan Dennis retired from the race after his win on Stage 16 to focus on the 2018 World Championships.

Stage 17
12 September 2018 — Getxo to Oiz,

Stage 18
13 September 2018 — Ejea de los Caballeros to Lleida,

Stage 19
14 September 2018 — Lleida to Naturlandia,

Stage 20
15 September 2018 — Escaldes-Engordany to Coll de la Gallina,

Stage 21
16 September 2018 — Alcorcón to Madrid,

Notes

References

2018 Vuelta a España
Vuelta a España stages